Maran (also Romanized as Marān) is a village in Seh Hezar Rural District, Khorramabad District, Tonekabon County, Mazandaran Province, Iran. At the 2006 census, its population was 152, in 51 families.

References 

Populated places in Tonekabon County